Trans-Sil Stadium is a multi-use stadium in Târgu Mureș, Romania. It is currently used mostly for football and is the home ground of ASA Târgu Mureș. Before 2018 it was the home ground of Trans-Sil Târgu Mureș and ASA 2013 Târgu Mureș. The stadium has an all-seating capacity of 8,200 spectators.

It is also known as Stadionul Municipal and Stadionul Siletina.

See also

List of football stadiums in Romania

References

 
 

Târgu Mureș
Buildings and structures in Târgu Mureș
Football venues in Romania